Daniel James Gossett (born November 13, 1992) is an American professional baseball pitcher. He has played for the Oakland Athletics of Major League Baseball (MLB).

Career
Gossett attended James F. Byrnes High School in Duncan, South Carolina. He was drafted by the Boston Red Sox in the 16th round of the 2011 MLB draft. He did not sign with the Red Sox, deciding to play college baseball at Clemson University instead.

Oakland Athletics
After his junior year in college, Gossett was selected by the Oakland Athletics in the second round of the 2014 MLB draft.

Gossett made his professional debut with the Class A-Short Season Vermont Lake Monsters in 2014. He played in 12 games with a 2.25 earned run average (ERA) and 25 strikeouts. He pitched with the Class A Beloit Snappers in 2015, ending with a 5–13 win–loss record, a 4.75 ERA, and 112 strikeouts. He started 2016 with the Class A-Advanced Stockton Ports and was promoted to the Double-A Midland RockHounds and Triple-A Nashville Sounds during the season. He finished the 2016 campaign with a 10–6 record and a 2.69 ERA with 151 strikeouts.

Gossett began the 2017 season with Nashville, and was promoted to Oakland on June 14 to make his major league debut that day against the Miami Marlins. He pitched the remainder of the season with the A's, going 4–11 in 18 starts with an ERA of 6.11 in  innings. In 2018, he was limited to five starts and underwent Tommy John surgery on July 31. He missed the remainder of the 2018 season and all of the 2019 season. On July 23, 2020, Gossett was designated for assignment. He was released on July 27.

Boston Red Sox
On January 4, 2021, Gossett signed a minor league contract with the Red Sox organization. In 20 appearances (18 starts) with the Triple-A Worcester Red Sox, he pitched to a 4.22 ERA and 7–5 record while striking out 81 batters in 98 innings. He became a free agent following the season.

Minnesota Twins
On February 17, 2022, Gossett signed a minor league contract with the Minnesota Twins. On August 19, 2022, he threw the first no-hitter in Wichita Wind Surge history, defeating the Tulsa Drillers 3-0. He elected free agency on November 10, 2022.

References

External links

Clemson Tigers bio

1992 births
Living people
Baseball players from South Carolina
Major League Baseball pitchers
Oakland Athletics players
Clemson Tigers baseball players
Vermont Lake Monsters players
Beloit Snappers players
Stockton Ports players
Midland RockHounds players
Nashville Sounds players
People from Lyman, South Carolina
Worcester Red Sox players